Meterana  is a genus of moths of the family Noctuidae. This genus is endemic to New Zealand.

Species
The following species are placed within this genus:
 Meterana alcyone (Hudson, 1898)
 Meterana asterope (Hudson, 1898)
 Meterana badia (Philpott, 1927)
 Meterana coctilis (Meyrick, 1931)
 Meterana coeleno (Hudson, 1898)
 Meterana decorata (Philpott, 1905)
 Meterana diatmeta (Hudson, 1898)
 Meterana dotata (Walker, 1857)
 Meterana exquisita (Philpott, 1903)
 Meterana grandiosa (Philpott, 1903)
 Meterana inchoata (Philpott, 1920)
 Meterana levis (Philpott, 1905)
 Meterana merope (Hudson, 1898)
 Meterana meyricci (Hampson, 1911)
 Meterana ochthistis (Meyrick, 1887)
 Meterana octans (Hudson, 1898)
 Meterana pansicolor (Howes, 1912)
 Meterana pascoi (Howes, 1912)
 Meterana pauca (Philpott, 1910)
 Meterana pictula (White, 1855)
 Meterana praesignis (Howes, 1911)
 Meterana stipata (Walker, 1865)
 Meterana tartarea (Butler, 1877)
 Meterana vitiosa (Butler, 1877)

References

Hadeninae
Moths of New Zealand
Endemic fauna of New Zealand
Endemic moths of New Zealand